Lovemarks is a marketing concept that is intended to replace the idea of brands. The idea was first widely publicized in a book of the same name  written by Kevin Roberts, CEO of the advertising agency Saatchi & Saatchi. In the book Roberts claims, "Brands are running out of juice". He considers that love is what is needed to rescue brands. Roberts asks, "What builds Loyalty that goes Beyond Reason? What makes a truly great love stand out?" Roberts suggests the following are the key ingredients to create lovemarks:
Mystery:
Great stories: past, present and future; taps into dreams, myths and icons; and inspiration
Sensuality:
Sound, sight, smell, touch, and taste
Intimacy: 
Commitment, empathy, and passion

Roberts explains the relationship between lovemarks and other selling concepts through a simple schema based on respect and love. The full schema is as follows: mere products (commodities) command neither love nor respect. Fads attract love, but without respect this love is just a passing infatuation. Brands attract respect, even lasting respect, but without love. Lovemarks, explains Roberts, command both respect and love. This is achieved through the trinity of mystery, sensuality, and intimacy.

Kevin Duncan describes the concept in more traditional marketing terms, noting that there are "two axes," one of which runs from low to high respect, and the other which runs from low to high love.  For a brand to transcend into "lovemark" category, it has to be high on both axes at once.  Duncan sums up the concept in one sentence thus: "Creating loyalty beyond reason requires emotional connections that generate the highest levels of love and respect for your brand."

In September 2006, Saatchi & Saatchi won a US$430 million JC Penney contract because of the idea of lovemarks.

Examples 
In the current world of marketing, there are a plethora of brands that use the concept of lovemarks behind their marketing strategies. One of the biggest examples is The Coca-Cola Company whose marketing campaigns are focused on transmitting emotions to the viewers of their TV advertisements. Another notable example is Cerveza Quilmes, an Argentine beer, who broadcast a commercial titled "#IGUALISMO", which translates as equality in English, and branded a medieval war between modern men and women, showing the differences between the two genders. At the end of the advertisement, they start begging for pardon from each other, and the Cerveza Quilmes' slogan is shown:- (translated from Spanish): "When machism and feminism encounter, equality borns. Quilmes, the flavour of encounter." In this example, the product (a beer) is not shown in the whole advertisement and instead, it is focused on transmitting a certain emotion to their target market (young adults, both male and female).

References

Further reading

External links 
 Official Website

Brand management
Marketing techniques